Beti is a 1969 Hindi drama film starring Sanjay Khan, Nanda and Kamini Kaushal in lead roles.

Cast 
 Sanjay Khan as Dr. Rajesh Anand
 Nanda as Sudha Verma
 Kishore Sahu as Mr. Verma
 Kamini Kaushal as Mrs. Verma
 Shyama as Mrs. Kamla Verma
 Rajendra Nath as Deepak
 Sarika Young Sudha

Story 
Mr. Verma (Kishore Sahu) a widower has two children: toddler Munna (Master Rippy) and elder Sudha (Baby Sarika). Sudha still a baby herself, but she looks after her father and Munna. While cooking she burns her foot. Mr. Verma remarries to Kamla (Shyama). She behaves like a typical stepmother. Misery strike them as Munna drowns while climbing a well.

Growing in such unfriendly environment, she (Nanda) becomes a secretary in an office. She meets Rajesh (Sanjay Khan) in a situation where he almost runs her over. Later she gets engaged to his friend Sudhir thinking that she is engaged to Rajesh, in an alliance settled by their parents. She tells him the same and both blissfully ignorant of the fact make merry. When the fact is known Sudha decides to marry Sudhir to save honour of the family. Mr Verma sells his house for 40,000 rupees to give dowry, which Kamla steals. The groom and marriage party returns on not getting dowry. Mr. Verma gets a stroke and is paralyzed. Kamla abandons them and Sudha takes care of her father. Both spend time in misery and hunger. Meanwhile, Sanjay on knowing that Sudha's marriage has been called off, come looking for her. Mr. Verma thinking himself a burden goes off and Sudha thinks he has died.

Music 
The music of the film was composed by Sonik Omi and lyrics by Shakeel Badayuni.

References

External links 
 

1960s Hindi-language films
1969 films
Films scored by Sonik-Omi
Films directed by Harmesh Malhotra